The 2008 Connacht Senior Football Championship was that year's installment of the annual Connacht Senior Football Championship held under the auspices of the Connacht GAA. It was won by Galway who defeated Mayo in the final. It was their fifth title of the decade and their 44th in their history. Had Galway lost it would have been the first time since 1937 that they would have lost three consecutive Connacht finals.

This was Galway's ninth such final in eleven years. However, this marked an important stage in the decline of Galway football as it was also their last senior Connacht title to date - they lost the 2009 final, exited the 2010-2012 championships at the semi-final stage and exited the 2013 championship at the quarter-final stage. The winning Galway team received the J. J. Nestor Cup, and automatically advanced to the quarter-final stage of the 2008 All-Ireland Senior Football Championship.

Bracket

Quarter-finals

Semi-finals

Final

Statistics
Top Scorer: E Mulligan (Leitrim); 0-20

References

External links
Connacht GAA website

2C
Connacht Senior Football Championship